General elections were held in Lebanon on 15 April 1951, with a second round in some constituencies on 22 April. Independent candidates won the majority of seats. Voter turnout was 54.7%.

Results

References

Lebanon
1951 in Lebanon
Elections in Lebanon
Election and referendum articles with incomplete results